The 2014 Home Hardware Canada Cup of Curling was held from December 3 to 7 at the Encana Arena in Camrose, Alberta. It was the first time that Camrose hosted the Canada Cup, and the second time that Alberta hosted the Canada Cup, which was also held in Medicine Hat in 2010.

Men

Teams
The teams are listed as follows:

Round Robin Standings
Final Round Robin Standings

Round Robin Results
The draw is listed as follows:

Draw 1
Wednesday, December 3, 8:30 am

Draw 2
Wednesday, December 3, 1:30 pm

Draw 3
Wednesday, December 3, 6:30 pm

Draw 4
Thursday, December 4, 8:30 am

Draw 5
Thursday, December 4, 1:30 pm

Draw 6
Thursday, December 4, 6:30 pm

Draw 7
Friday, December 5, 8:30 am

Draw 8
Friday, December 5, 1:30 pm

Draw 9
Friday, December 5, 6:30 pm

Playoffs

Semifinal
Saturday, December 6, 6:30 pm

Final
Sunday, December 7, 5:00 pm

Women

Teams
The teams are listed as follows:

Round Robin Standings
Final Round Robin Standings

Round Robin Results
The draw is listed as follows:

Draw 1
Wednesday, December 3, 8:30 am

Draw 2
Wednesday, December 3, 1:30 pm

Draw 3
Wednesday, December 3, 6:30 pm

Draw 4
Thursday, December 4, 8:30 am

Draw 5
Thursday, December 4, 1:30 pm

Draw 6
Thursday, December 4, 6:30 pm

Draw 7
Friday, December 5, 8:30 am

Draw 8
Friday, December 5, 1:30 pm

Draw 9
Friday, December 5, 6:30 pm

Playoffs

Semifinal
Saturday, December 6, 1:30 pm

Final
Sunday, December 7, 10:00 am

References

External links

Archived Statistics - Women

2014 Canada Cup
Canada Cup, 2014
Sport in Camrose, Alberta
Canada Cup, 2014
Canada Cup of Curling
Canada Cup of Curling